Koźle  is a village in the administrative district of Gmina Szamotuły, within Szamotuły County, Greater Poland Voivodeship, in west-central Poland.

History
Koźle was a private village of Polish nobility, administratively located in the Poznań County in the Poznań Voivodeship in the Greater Poland Province of the Polish Crown.

In 1939 and 1942, the occupiers carried out expulsions of Poles, whose farms were then handed over to ethnic Germans as part of the Lebensraum policy. Poles expelled in 1939 were briefly held in a transit camp in Wronki, where they were stripped of any valuables, and then deported to the Radom District of the General Government (German-occupied central Poland), while those expelled in 1942 were enslaved as forced labour and sent either to Germany or to new German colonists in the county.

References

Villages in Szamotuły County